Raimondo Cunich or Rajmundo Kunić (January 17, 1719 – November 22, 1794) was a Greek and Latin humanist.

Cunich was born in the Republic of Ragusa, in the small town of Ragusa Vecchia, he lost his father early in life. In 1734, at age fifteen, he was sent to the order of the Society of Jesus (Jesuits) in Rome. He became, along with Ruđer Bošković, one of the most illustrious academics produced by the Republic of Ragusa.

Cunich spent twenty-seven years teaching Latin and Greek in Florence, Rome and other parts of Italy. He wrote several elegant orations, including one for Pope Clement XIII, and many epigrams and elegies following Tibullus and Catullus. He translated Theocritus and the epigrams of the Greek Anthology. His best-known work is the Latin translation of The Iliad: "Homeri Ilias Latinis Versibus Expressa" (1776).

See also
 List of notable Ragusans
 Dalmatia
 History of Dalmatia

External links
 Raimund Cunich listing in Biographisches Lexikon des Kaisertums Österreich Dritter Teil Cöremans - Eger

1719 births
1794 deaths
18th-century Croatian writers
Croatian Jesuits
Italian Latinists
Dalmatian Italians
Ragusan clergy
Croatian male writers
18th-century male writers
Translators of Homer
Ragusan scholars